The Gallaher Ulster Open was a professional golf tournament that was played in Northern Ireland between 1965 and 1971. It was last played the year prior to the formation of the formally organised professional tour which evolved into the European Tour, and was a British PGA Order of Merit counting event.

Winners

References

Golf tournaments in Northern Ireland